The Reedy River is a tributary of the Saluda River, about  long, in northwestern South Carolina in the United States.  Via the Saluda and Congaree rivers, it is part of the watershed of the Santee River, which flows to the Atlantic Ocean.

The Reedy River Falls: Big Brother
Big Brother, or "The Falls", is a large waterfall that flows through Falls Park in Greenville, South Carolina. It is overseen by the Liberty Bridge. Sliding down the falls is illegal according to Greenville law, but it is still practiced by many kayakers and other adventure seekers.

Course

Pollution
The pollution in the river was identified to be unfit for humans because of E. coli. Children were commonly seen sliding down rocks in a section of the river in Falls Park and the practice is now discouraged by signage and mild policing. Though it's not necessarily unsafe to wade in the waters, it's under studied.

There are ongoing efforts to improve water quality along the whole of the Reedy River by the city, volunteers, and private companies. Educating on clean water practices (e.g. Cleaning up after pets in the park) and Enacting programs such as 319 grant that offer grants to people with septic malfunctions instead of letting the issue go without maintenance, polluting ground water.

Crossings
The following is a list of crossings of the Reedy River from Greenville downstream starting in downtown Greenville at US 123.  This list may at times be incomplete.
City of Greenville
US 123/S Academy Street
River Street bridge
Pedestrian bridge at the Peace Center, converted from a former railroad bridge
Main Street bridge at Camperdown
Liberty Bridge
US 29/S Church Street
McDaniel Avenue
Woodland Way in Cleveland Park
E Faris Road
Cleveland Street
S Pleasantburg Drive, SC 291
Interstate 85
Greenville County
Mauldin Road
Conestee Road
Ashmore Bridge Road
Interstate 185
Log Shoals Road
W Georgia Road
New Harrison Bridge Road
Jenkins Bridge Road and SC 418
McKelvey Road in Fork Shoals
McKittrick Bridge Road
Hillside Church Road
Dunklin Bridge Road
Laurens County
US 76 in Hickory Tavern
SC 252
Ekom Beach Road
Indian Mound Road
Riverfork Road over Lake Greenwood

See also
List of South Carolina rivers

Sources
Columbia Gazetteer of North America entry
DeLorme (1998).  South Carolina Atlas & Gazetteer.  Yarmouth, Maine: DeLorme.  .

American Whitewater

References

Rivers of South Carolina
Rivers of Greenville County, South Carolina
Rivers of Laurens County, South Carolina
Tributaries of the Santee River